This is a list of American philosophers; of philosophers who are either from, or spent many productive years of their lives in the United States.

A
Francis Ellingwood Abbot
David Abram
Peter Achinstein
Marilyn McCord Adams
Robert Merrihew Adams
Jane Addams
Mortimer Adler
Rogers Albritton
Amos Bronson Alcott
Linda Martín Alcoff
Virgil Aldrich
Hartley Burr Alexander
Diogenes Allen
Robert F. Almeder
William Alston
Alice Ambrose
Karl Ameriks
C. Anthony Anderson
Elizabeth S. Anderson
Gordon Anderson
Judith Andre
Julia Annas
Ruth Nanda Anshen
Louise Antony
Hannah Arendt
Richard Arneson
Robert Arp
Robert Arrington
Bradley Shavit Artson
Warren Ashby
Januarius Jingwa Asongu
Margaret Atherton
Robert Audi
Jody Azzouni

B
Babette Babich
Kent Bach
Max Baginski
Archie J. Bahm
Gordon Park Baker
Lynne Rudder Baker
Dan Barker
William Barratt
William Warren Bartley, III
Daniel Barwick
Jacques Barzun
Monroe Beardsley
Tom Beauchamp
Lewis White Beck
Lawrence C. Becker
Hugo Adam Bedau
Nuel Belnap
Paul Benacerraf
Gustav Bergmann
Michael Bergmann
Arnold Berleant
Marshall Berman
Andrew Bernstein
Mark Bernstein
Richard J. Bernstein
Marcus Berquist
Yogi Berra
Steven Best
Nalini Bhushan
Cristina Bicchieri
Max Black
Brand Blanshard
Ned Block
Benjamin Paul Blood
Allan Bloom
Albert Blumberg
George Boas
Chris Bobonich
Paul Boghossian
Peter Boghossian
David Bohm
Laurence BonJour
John Elof Boodin
George Boolos
Susan Bordo
Albert Borgmann
Oets Kolk Bouwsma
Francis Bowen
Borden Parker Bowne
Richard Boyd
Robert Brandom
Richard Brandt
Giannina Braschi
David Braybrooke
Daniel Brock
Baruch Brody
Stephen Bronner
Mel Brooks
Baker Brownell
William Lowe Bryan
Scott Buchanan
Justus Buchler
Jay Budziszewski
Nicholas C. Burbules
Tyler Burge
Kenneth Burke
Edwin Arthur Burtt
Panayot Butchvarov
Judith Butler
Charles Butterworth

C
Mary Whiton Calkins
J. Baird Callicott
Donald T. Campbell
Arthur Caplan
John Caputo
Claudia Card
Richard Carrier
Noël Carroll
Paul Carus
Edward S. Casey
Stanley Cavell
William H. Chamberlin
Edmond La Beaume Cherbonnier
James Childress
Roderick Chisholm
Noam Chomsky
Patricia Churchland
Paul Churchland
Gordon Haddon Clark
Kenneth Clatterbaugh
Roy A. Clouser
Carl Cohen
Joshua Cohen
James F. Conant
William E. Connolly
Moncure D. Conway
Josephus Flavius Cook
Paul Copan
James A. Corbett
Robert S. Corrington
John Corvino
William Craig
William Lane Craig
Alice Crary
James Edwin Creighton
Joseph Cropsey
Steven Crowell
Charles Marriot Culver

D
Norman Daniels
Arthur Danto
Donald Davidson
Michael Davis
Michael Peter Davis
Alfred de Grazia
David DeGrazia
Grace de Laguna
Theodore de Laguna
John Deely
Daniel Dennett
Christian de Quincey
Keith DeRose
Jan Deutsch
John Dewey
Cora Diamond
Donna Dickenson
Keith Donnellan
Elliot N. Dorff
Bradley Dowden
Paul Draper
Theodore Drange
Burton Dreben
Gary Drescher
Fred Dretske
Hubert Dreyfus
Raymond Duncan
Barrows Dunham
Will Durant
Ronald Dworkin

E
William A. Earle
John Earman
Frank Ebersole
James M. Edie
Paul Edwards
Jonathan Edwards
Albert Einstein
Loren Eiseley
Catherine Elgin
Marc H. Ellis
Ralph Waldo Emerson
Mylan Engel
H. Tristram Engelhardt, Jr.
E. E. Ericksen
Stephen L. Esquith
David Estlund
Rod L. Evans
Emmanuel Chukwudi Eze

F
Marvin Farber
James E. Faulconer
Joel Feinberg
Fred Feldman
Ernest Fenollosa
Edward Feser
Hartry Field
Arthur Fine
Kit Fine
Guy Finley
John Martin Fischer
John Fiske
Leonard M. Fleck
Ralph Tyler Flewelling
Jerry Fodor
William Fontaine
Charles Frankel
William Frankena
Harry Frankfurt
Betty Friedan
Erich Fromm
Marilyn Frye
Francis Fukuyama
Christopher Fynsk

G
Shaun Gallagher
David Gauthier
Norman Geisler
Michael Gelven
Tamar Gendler
Eugene Gendlin
Alexander George
Robert P. George
Emanuel Vogel Gerhart
Brie Gertler
Edmund Gettier
Raymond Geuss
Alan Gewirth
Allan Gibbard
Kahlil Gibran
Fred Gifford
Neil Gillman
René Girard
Sue Golding
Alvin Goldman
Emma Goldman
Rebecca Goldstein
Nelson Goodman
Allan Gotthelf
Jorge J. E. Gracia
Kersey Graves
Maxine Greene
Marjorie Grene
David Ray Griffin
Robert Grudin
Paul Guyer

H
Garry L. Hagberg
Everett W. Hall
Manly Palmer Hall
Philip Hallie
Jean Elizabeth Hampton
Norwood Russell Hanson
Sandra Harding
John E. Hare
Gilbert Harman
Errol Harris
Leonard Harris
Sam Harris
William Torrey Harris
Sally Haslanger
Gilbert Harman
Robert S. Hartman
Charles Hartshorne
Donald West Harward
William Hasker
John Haugeland
Spencer Heath
John Heil
Laurens Perseus Hickok
Stephen Hicks
Kathleen Higgins
Marian Hillar
William Hirstein
William Ernest Hocking
Eric Hoffer
Douglas Hofstadter
Arthur F. Holmes
Gerald Holton
Sidney Hook
John Hospers
Vernon Howard
George Holmes Howison
Elbert Hubbard
Michael Huemer
Colin Hughes
David Hull
Hans-Hermann Hoppe

I
Peter van Inwagen

J
William James
Fredric Jameson
Martin Jay
Nancy S. Jecker
Thomas Jefferson
Alexander Bryan Johnson
David Alan Johnson
Mark Johnson
Rufus Jones
Edward Jones-Imhotep

K
John Kaag
Shelly Kagan
Horace Kallen
Frances Kamm
Robert Kane
Abraham Kaplan
David Kaplan
Mordecai Kaplan
Jerrold Katz
Peter Kaufmann
Walter Kaufmann
R.P. Kaushik
Sam Keen
David Kelley
Cassius Jackson Keyser
Jaegwon Kim
Stanton Davis Kirkham
Patricia Kitcher
Jacob Klein
Peter D. Klein
Joshua Knobe
Ned Kock
David Koepsell
David Kolb
Robert Koons
Hilary Kornblith
Christine Korsgaard
Matthew Kramer
Michael Krausz
Peter Kreeft
Werner Krieglstein
Saul Kripke
J Krishnamurti
Mark Kuczewski
Thomas Samuel Kuhn
Paul Kurtz

L
George Trumbull Ladd
Grace de Laguna
Corliss Lamont
Mark Lance
Charles Lane
William Lane Craig
Susanne Langer
Charles Larmore
Jonathan Lear
Keith Lehrer
Brian Leiter
James G. Lennox
Isaac Levi
Michael Levin
Clarence Irving Lewis
David Kellogg Lewis
Mark Lilla
Hilde Lindemann
Alphonso Lingis
Leonard Linsky
Matthew Lipman
Alfred Henry Lloyd
Elisabeth Lloyd
Alain LeRoy Locke
Loren Lomasky
Max Freedom Long
Helen Longino
William Lycan
Helen Lynd

M
Dwight Macdonald
Tibor R. Machan
Alasdair MacIntyre
Louis H. Mackey
Ruth Macklin
James Madison
Robert Magliola
Norman Malcolm
David Manley
Jesse Mann
Ruth Barcan Marcus
Joseph Margolis
Don Marquis
Erwin Marquit
Bill Martin
Donald A. Martin
Everett Dean Martin
Michael Martin
Richard Milton Martin
Benson Mates
Gareth Matthews
George I. Mavrodes
Todd May
Ernst W. Mayr
Thomas A. McCarthy
Ron McClamrock
John H. McClendon
Janet McCracken
Evander Bradley McGilvary
Leemon McHenry
Terence McKenna
Matthew W. McKeon
Richard McKeon
Jeff McMahan
William McNeill
George Herbert Mead
Jack Meiland
Alfred Mele
Stephen Menn
Franklin Merrell-Wolff
Trenton Merricks
Leonard B. Meyer
Stephen C. Meyer
Sidney Edward Mezes
John William Miller
Mitchell Miller
Richard W. Miller
Elijah Millgram
Ruth Millikan
Philip Mirowski
Carl Mitcham
Sandra Mitchell
Ann M. Mongoven
Richard Montague
William Pepperell Montague
Ernest Addison Moody
Addison Webster Moore
Charles A. Moore
Paul Elmer More
J. P. Moreland
John Henry Morgan
Sidney Morgenbesser
Charles W. Morris
Christopher W. Morris
Thomas V. Morris
Paul Moser
Athanasios Moulakis
V. Y. Mudimbe

N
Ernest Nagel
Thomas Nagel
Debra Nails
Louis Narens
Jacob Needleman
John Neihardt
Jamie Lindemann Nelson
Michael P. Nelson
Jay Newman
Shaun Nichols
Jeffrey Nielsen
Richard Thomas Nolan
Calvin Normore
David L. Norton
Michael Novak
Claude Nowell
Robert Nozick
Martha Nussbaum

O
James Otteson

P
Thomas Paine
George Herbert Palmer
Thomas Pangle
George Pappas
Leonard Peikoff
Charles Sanders Peirce
Gregory Pence
Stephen Pepper
Ralph Barton Perry
Robert B. Pippin
Robert M. Pirsig
Walter B. Pitkin
Alvin Plantinga
Richard Popkin
Richard Posner
Robert M. Price
Harry Prosch
Hilary Putnam
Ruth Anna Putnam

Q
Willard Van Orman Quine

R
James Rachels
John Herman Randall, Jr.
Ayn Rand
Robert Bruce Raup
Jerome Ravetz
Heidi Ravven
John Rawls
Frederick Rauscher
George Lansing Raymond
Michael C. Rea
William L. Reese
Tom Regan
Victor Reppert
Hans Reichenbach
Nicholas Rescher
Philip H. Rhinelander
Adrienne Rich
William J. Richardson
Laurence Rickels
Isaac Woodbridge Riley
James Robb
Daniel N. Robinson
Rick Roderick
Bernard Rollin
Holmes Rolston III
Avital Ronell
Richard Rorty
Stanley Rosen
Alexander Rosenberg
Jay Rosenberg
Eugen Rosenstock-Huessy
David M. Rosenthal
Stephen David Ross
Gian-Carlo Rota
Murray Rothbard
William L. Rowe
Josiah Royce
Michael Ruse
David Rynin
Ravi Zacharias

S
William S. Sahakian
Paul Saka
John Sallis
Nathan Salmon
Michael Sandel
Ellis Sandoz
David H. Sanford
Larry Sanger
George Santayana
Crispin Sartwell
Jennifer Saul
Geoffrey Sayre-McCord
Kenneth M. Sayre
T.M. Scanlon 
Diana Schaub
Tommie Shelby
Naomi Scheman
Theodore Schick
Tad Schmaltz
David Schmidtz
J. B. Schneewind
Herbert Schneider
Harold M. Schulweis
Alfred Schütz
Lisa H. Schwartzman
David Schweickart
John Searle
Roy Wood Sellars
Wilfrid Sellars
Jeremy J. Shapiro
Michael J. Shapiro
Scott J. Shapiro
Stewart Shapiro
William Shaw
George Sher
Warren Shibles
Sydney Shoemaker
Richard Shusterman
Hugh J. Silverman
Edgar A. Singer, Jr.
Irving Singer
David Skrbina
Brian Skyrms
Barry Smith
George H. Smith
Quentin Smith
Tara Smith
T. V. Smith
Wolfgang Smith
Raymond Smullyan
Joseph D. Sneed
Laura J. Snyder
Scott Soames
Alan Soble
Robert C. Solomon
Joseph B. Soloveitchik
Tamler Sommers
Frederick Sontag
Pitirim Sorokin
David Sosa
Ernest Sosa
Lysander Spooner
Elmer Sprague
Robert Stalnaker
Lawrence Stepelevich
Charles Stevenson
Stephen Stich
Leo Strauss
David Strong
Barry Stroud
Peter Suber
William Graham Sumner
Frederick Suppe
Patrick Suppes

T
William W. Tait
Nassim Nicholas Taleb
Richard Tarnas
Alfred I. Tauber
Kenneth Allen Taylor
Mark C. Taylor
Paul Taylor
Richard Taylor
Neil Tennant
Larry Temkin
Irving Thalberg, Jr.
Laurence Thomas
Paul B. Thompson
Iain Thomson
Judith Jarvis Thomson
Henry David Thoreau
Paul Tillich
Samuel Martin Thompson
Samuel Todes
Michael Tooley
Benjamin Tucker
Anna-Teresa Tymieniecka

U
Robert Ulanowicz
Peter Unger
Wilbur Marshall Urban

V
William F. Vallicella
Paul van Buren
Bas van Fraassen
Peter van Inwagen
Achille Varzi
Henry Babcock Veatch
J. David Velleman
Eric Voegelin
Alice von Hildebrand

W
James D. Wallace
Kendall Walton
Mary Anne Warren
Carl Watner
Alan Watts
Brian Weatherson
David Weinberger
Jack Russell Weinstein
Max Weismann
Paul Weiss
Morris Weitz
Cornel West
Anthony Weston
Jonathan Westphal
Gregory Wheeler
Morton White
Alfred North Whitehead
Walt Whitman
Dan Wikler
Ken Wilber
John Daniel Wild
Dallas Willard
William Mackintire Salter
Michael Williams
Bruce Wilshire
Robert Anton Wilson
William J. Winslade
Susan Wolf
Robert Paul Wolff
Nicholas Wolterstorff
Paul Woodruff
Chauncey Wright

Y
Stephen Yablo
Keith Yandell
Igor Yefimov
Arthur M. Young
Iris Marion Young

Z
Naomi Zack 
Linda Trinkaus Zagzebski
John Zerzan
Paul Ziff
Dean Zimmerman
Michael E. Zimmerman

See also 
 American philosophy
 List of Jewish American philosophers
 List of African American philosophers
 List of philosophers

References

 
American
Philosophers